Gregory Allen Brock (born June 14, 1957) is a retired baseball player who played for 10 seasons in Major League Baseball.  A first baseman for his entire major league career, he split his time evenly between the Los Angeles Dodgers and Milwaukee Brewers.

Early life
Brock was born in McMinnville, Oregon, the son of Joe Brock, who coached baseball at Stayton High School. Greg played for his father at the school, and in 1995 had his jersey retired. Brock attended the University of Wyoming.

Career statistics
In 1013 games over 10 major league seasons, Brock posted a .248 batting average (794-for-3202) with 420 runs, 141 doubles, 6 triples, 110 home runs, 462 RBI, 41 stolen bases, 434 bases on balls, .338 on-base percentage and .399 slugging percentage. Defensively, he recorded a .994 fielding percentage as a first baseman. In the 1983 and 1985 National League Championship Series, he hit only .048 (1-for-21) with 3 runs, 1 home run, 2 RBI and 2 walks in 8 games.

References

External links

Greg Brock at Pura Pelota (Venezuelan Professional Baseball League)

1957 births
Living people
American expatriate baseball players in Canada
Albuquerque Dukes players
Baseball players from Oregon
Beloit Brewers players
Lethbridge Dodgers players
Lodi Dodgers players
Los Angeles Dodgers players
Major League Baseball first basemen
Milwaukee Brewers players
Navegantes del Magallanes players
American expatriate baseball players in Venezuela
Sportspeople from McMinnville, Oregon
San Antonio Dodgers players
Vancouver Canadians players
Wyoming Cowboys baseball players